Thrift Store Cowboys are an alternative country and indie rock band, formed in 1999, in Lubbock, Texas by Daniel Fluitt and Colt Miller.  Presently the band also includes Clint Miller, Amanda Shires, Cory Ames, Kris Killingsworth. The band was featured on KTTZ program 24 Frames.

The band has toured a significant portion of the southeastern and western U.S., touring with acts such as DeVotchKa and Cory Branan. Additionally, Thrift Store Cowboys have shared a bill with Old 97s, the Flatlanders, Lucero, Joe Ely, and Centro-Matic.

Members

 Daniel Fluitt: - Vocals, rhythm guitar, lap steel guitar, saw
 Colt Miller: - Electric & baritone guitar, accordion, banjo and pedal steel
 Clint Miller: - Bass guitar
 Cory Ames: - Wurlitzer, Rhodes, various
 Amanda "Pearl" Shires: - Fiddle, vocals
 Kris Killingsworth: - Drums, Glockenspiel, vocals

Discography

Nowhere With You (2001)
The Great American Desert (2003)
Lay Low While Crawling or Creeping (2006)
7" Vinyl Split w/ One Wolf (Mt. Inadale Records 2009)
Light Fighter (2010)
 Lay Low While Crawling or Creeping - 10 Year Anniversary Vinyl (2016)

Live recordings

Live at Sabala's (2005) - Limited Edition live CD out of print
Live at Taos Solar Music Fest (2007)

External links and sources
 Live and Breathing Sessions
Thrift Store Cowboys Website

References

American alternative country groups
Indie rock musical groups from Texas
Musical groups established in 1999
1999 establishments in Texas